The Sikh Temple of Yuba City in Yuba City, California was opened on October 21, 1969 and serves over 20,000 Sikhs in the area which is home to many Sikhs and Punjabis. The Gurdwara has a main Langar hall and prayer hall.

See also
Gurdwaras in the United States

References

Sources
Official Temple website

Yuba City
Yuba City, California